The Grand Council of Aargau is the legislature of the canton of Aargau, in Switzerland.  Aargau has a unicameral legislature. The Grand Council has 140 seats, with members elected every four years. The most recent election was on October 18, 2020.

Parties 
At the elections between 1997 and 2020 the parties won the following number of seats and votes:

Members 
 List of members of the Grand Council of Aargau (2021–2024)

References

External links
  Grand Council of Aargau official website

Aargau
Politics of Aargau
Aargau